Agnes "Sis" Cunningham (February 19, 1909 – June 27, 2004) was an American musician, best known for her involvement as a performer and publicist of folk music and protest songs. She was the founding editor of Broadside magazine, which she published with her husband Gordon Friesen and their daughters.

Early life
Agnes Cunningham was born in Blaine County, Oklahoma, United States, the daughter of Ada Boyce and William Cunningham, a small holding farmer and fiddler.  Her father was a socialist and follower of Eugene Debs, the socialist leader. As a child, she learned piano, accordion, and musical arrangement. In 1929, she attended the Weatherford (Oklahoma) Teachers' College where she studied music.  After graduating from Weatherford Teachers' College, Agnes Cunningham worked in the public school system teaching music.  In 1932, Cunningham went on to the Commonwealth Labor College near Mena, Arkansas, where she studied labor organizing and Marxism.  During her time there, Agnes Cunningham also studied labor journalism and labor-farmer union development as well as learned about social theatre.  During this time, she started to write labor songs.  Completing her coursework and moving back to Oklahoma, Agnes Cunningham began recruiting for the Southern Tenant Farmers' Union.

Career
In 1937, she became a music teacher at the Southern Labor School for Women in North Carolina. She taught politically oriented music, including labor-union standards, political songs such as those written by Bertholt Brecht and Hanns Eisler, and topical songs, including some of her own original compositions.

In late 1939, she was a founding member of the Red Dust Players, an agit-prop group in Oklahoma, that promoted propaganda and political agitation through short plays.  Performing throughout the countryside in Oklahoma at union meetings, the Red Dust Players sought to educate tenant-farmers, sharecroppers, and farm workers on how the union could benefit them. Fleeing harassment, she and fellow Communist Party member Gordon Friesen married on July 23, 1941, in the course of fleeing to New York City.

In New York, they moved into the Greenwich Village household known as Almanac House: housemates included Pete Seeger and Woody Guthrie, and Cunningham was briefly a member of the Almanac Singers, appearing on the 1942 album Dear Mr. President for Keynote Records. After attempting unsuccessfully to start a Detroit, Michigan, equivalent of the Almanacs, she took a job in a defense plant, while Friesen went to work as a reporter for the Detroit Times.

In 1945, Agnes Cunningham was on the founding committee of People's Songs, an organization founded on December 31, 1945 in New York City by Pete Seeger, Alan Lomax, Lee Hays and many others.  People's Songs went bankrupt in 1948, but the People's Songs Bulletin served as a template for Broadside Magazine that was later co-founded by Agnes Cunningham.

Sis Cunningham was also a songwriter: her "How Can You Keep on Movin' (Unless You Migrate Too)?" found its way into the New Lost City Ramblers' 1959 album Songs of the Depression, and following them, Ry Cooder also recorded it, as a strident march, on his album Into the Purple Valley; Cooder was unaware of its authorship and attributed it as "Traditional"  until the omission was pointed out to him; he and the label corrected the attribution on later pressings.

Her Dust Bowl tale, "My Oklahoma Home", written with her brother Bill Cunningham, was performed by Seeger in 1961, fell into oblivion, and then was revived by Bruce Springsteen in 2006 for his We Shall Overcome: The Seeger Sessions album and subsequent Seeger Sessions Band Tour.

A lasting contribution of Sis Cunningham and Gordon Friesen was to publish a little magazine for 26 years: Broadside, which printed the words and music to newly written folk and topical songs by Bob Dylan, Malvina Reynolds, Phil Ochs, Janis Ian, Tom Paxton, Buffy Sainte-Marie, and many others. Recordings of songs that had been published in their magazine were collected in 2000 in a five-CD set, The Best of Broadside, on Smithsonian Folkways, which received two Grammy Award nominations.

Despite Agnes Cunningham being out of the music scene for years, she and her husband were able to start Broadside when Seeger provided them with a subsidy for the endeavor in 1962.  Agnes and her husband started Broadside, mimeographing it on a machine inherited from the American Labour Party.  The couple had to smuggle out copies of Broadside because the housing project that they lived in did not allow domestic commercial ventures.  Many young musicians, including Dylan, Phil Ochs, Gil Turner, and many more, recorded tunes inside Agnes Cunningham's family apartment.  She would transcribe the songs, both lyrics and musical notation, while Gordon Friesen wrote the commentary.  Even though Broadside'''s circulation did not surpass four figures, it became influential across the country.

Cunningham continued to be politically active, taking part in events such as hootenannies, despite her advancing age.  She and Broadside continued to influence and inspire topical music, with Broadside reaching its apex around 1970.

1945 to 1962
After World War II, Cunningham and Friesen were among the first victims of the anti-communist blacklist. She secured a few bookings as part of the roster of Pete Seeger's booking agency, People's Songs, but between ill health, trying to raise a family in poverty, and personal depression, she largely fell out of the music world for over a decade.

In 1962, Cunningham reemerged into the public eye as the founding editor of Broadside magazine. This magazine published the songs of many of the 1960s' most influential topical songwriters, including Bob Dylan, Phil Ochs, Janis Ian, Tom Paxton, The Freedom Singers, Buffy Sainte Marie, Len Chandler, and Malvina Reynolds. Although the magazine, in John Pietaro's words "a vital part of the folk revival", survived until 1988, it was always a shoestring operation — several times, subsidies from Pete Seeger and his wife Toshi Seeger kept it afloat. Among its legacies was a five-CD box set called The Best of Broadside, 1962–1988.

In 1976, Folkways Records released Broadside Ballads, Vol. 9: Sundown, Cunningham's only solo album on the label (though she had been featured on several other albums, including Seeger's Broadside Ballads, Vol. and Phil Ochs' Broadside Tapes 1).

Later years
During most of their later lives, Cunningham and Friesen lived on West 98th Street in Manhattan, with their daughter Jane Friesen, grand daughter Ellie Thomas, and great grandson Nicholas Toth.  Toward the end of their lives they wrote a "joint autobiography", Red Dust and Broadsides.  Friesen died in 1996, and Cunningham followed in June 2004.

Notes

References
Duffy, Peter, "Words and Music for a Revolution," New York Times, February 11, 2001.
Cunningham, Agnes "Sis", and Gordon Friesen, Red Dust and Broadsides: A Joint Autobiography'', edited by Ronald D. Cohen, with a Foreword by Pete Seeger (Amherst: University of Massachusetts Press, 1999),

External links
Ronald D. Cohen Collection, Southern Folklife Collection, University of North Carolina at Chapel Hill
Cunningham Discography at Smithsonian Folkways
Encyclopedia of Oklahoma History and Culture – Cunningham, Agnes 

1909 births
2004 deaths
American communists
American women singer-songwriters
American folk singers
American folk-song collectors
People from Watonga, Oklahoma
20th-century American singers
20th-century American women singers
Women folklorists
Singer-songwriters from Oklahoma